The 2011–12 Kent State Golden Flashes men's basketball team represented Kent State University during the 2011–12 NCAA Division I men's basketball season. The Golden Flashes, led by first year head coach Rob Senderoff, played their home games at the Memorial Athletic and Convocation Center and are members of the East Division of the Mid-American Conference. They finished the season 21–12, 10–6 in MAC play to finish in fourth place in the East Division. They lost in the semifinals of the MAC Basketball tournament to Akron. They were invited to the 2012 CollegeInsider.com Tournament where they lost in the first round to USC Upstate.

Roster

Schedule

|-
!colspan=9| Exhibition

|-
!colspan=9| Regular season

|-
!colspan=9| 2012 MAC men's basketball tournament

|-
!colspan=9| 2012 CIT

References

Kent State Golden Flashes men's basketball seasons
Kent State
Kent State
Kent State
Kent State